Shaver Lake Heights (formerly, Shaver Lake) is an unincorporated community in Fresno County, California. It is located on the southwest bank of Shaver Lake, at an elevation of 5600 feet (1707 m).

The first post office was established at Shaver Lake in 1928.

References

Unincorporated communities in California
Unincorporated communities in Fresno County, California